The 2013 Bulgarian Supercup was played on 10 July 2013 at Vasil Levski National Stadium in Sofia, between the winners of the previous season's A group and Bulgarian Cup competitions. The match was contested by the champions of the 2012–13 A PFG, Ludogorets Razgrad, and the 2013 Bulgarian Cup winners, Beroe Stara Zagora.   

This was the second Supercup final for both teams with Ludogorets winning their first one against Lokomotiv Plovdiv in 2012 and Beroe losing to Litex Lovech in 2010 after extra time. Beroe won their first ever Supercup after defeating Ludogorets on penalties.

Match details

References

2013
Supercup
PFC Ludogorets Razgrad matches
Bulgarian Supercup 2013